Akhil Sachdeva is an Indian musician, singer and composer. His song Humsafar was featured in the Bollywood film Badrinath Ki Dulhania.

In 2009, Sachdeva started as the lead vocalist of the Delhi-based music band, Nasha. His Bollywood journey started when he happened to meet Shashank Khaitan, the director of the film, at his friend Huma Qureshi's Eid dinner. His song Tera Ban Jaunga from the film Kabir Singh has garnered a fantastic response worldwide. He is currently managed by Mourjo Chatterjee ( On Stage talents )

He did his Bachelors (with Honours) in Economics from the prestigious Delhi College of Arts & Commerce, University of Delhi.

Discography

Bollywood

Singles

Album

Web series

Awards and Nomination

Winner
2017
 Zee Cine Awards Best Playback Singer (Male) for "Humsafar" from Badrinath Ki Dulhania
 International Indian Film Academy Awards Best Music Director for Badrinath Ki Dulhania along with Amaal Mallik and Tanishk Bagchi
2019
 Star Screen Awards Best Music Director for Kabir Singh along with Mithoon, Amaal Mallik, Sachet–Parampara and Vishal Mishra
2020

 Filmfare Award for Best Music Director for Kabir Singh along with  Mithoon, Amaal Mallik, Sachet–Parampara and Vishal Mishra
 Zee Cine Awards for Best Music Director for Kabir Singh along with  Mithoon, Amaal Mallik, Sachet–Parampara and Vishal Mishra

2021

 International Indian Film Academy Awards Best Music Director for Kabir Singh along with Mithoon, Amaal Mallik, Sachet–Parampara and Vishal Mishra

Nomination
2017
Filmfare Award for Best Playback Singer (Male) for "Humsafar" from Badrinath Ki Dulhania
Filmfare Award for Best Music Director for Badrinath Ki Dulhania along with Amaal Mallik and Tanishk Bagchi
Zee Cine Awards for Best Lyrics for "Humsafar" from Badrinath Ki Dulhania
Zee Cine Awards for Best Music Director along with Amaal Malik, Tanishk Bagchi and Bappi Lahiri
2018

 News18 Reel Movie Awards for Best Music Director for Badrinath Ki Dulhania along with Amaal Malik, Tanishk Bagchi, Bappi Lahiri
 News18 Reel Movie Awards for Best Playback Singer (Male) for "Humsafar" from Badrinath Ki Dulhania

References

External links 

 
 
 
 

Living people
Indian male playback singers
Bollywood playback singers
Year of birth missing (living people)
Zee Cine Awards winners